Kogelberg Dam is a combined gravity & arch type dam located on the Palmiet River, near Grabouw, Western Cape, South Africa. It was established in 1986 and its primary purpose is to serve for irrigation and industrial use. The hazard potential of the dam has been ranked high (3).

See also
List of reservoirs and dams in South Africa
List of rivers of South Africa

References 

 List of South African Dams from the Department of Water Affairs and Forestry (South Africa)

Dams in South Africa
Elgin, Western Cape
Buildings and structures in the Western Cape
Dams completed in 1986